Nagasamy Ramachandran (born 1975) is a contemporary artist born in Paramakudi, Madurai, Tamil Nadu, Received his bachelor's degree (distinction) and master's degree in painting and printmaking from the Government College of Fine Arts, Chennai, University of Madras in 1999. To enhance his technical skill he undertook a course on Care of museum objects at Chennai Museum in 2005. He went to Edinburgh on a Visiting Artist Scholar to Scotland to learn Photo-polymer Etching at Edinburg printmakers in 2006. In 2008 he went to Edinburg College of Arts on Charles Wallace India Trust Award, to learn Glass making a special course BA (hons.). Other than these international credits he has received important national and state awards.

Awards and honours
2011 Audi Ritz icon Award, Chennai.
2008-09 	Charles Wallace India trust Award. Visiting Scholar to UK.Charles Wallace India Trust Award
2008		National Academy Award for 50th National exhibition of Art, Lalit Kala Akademi.
2006		Edinburgh Printmakers Visiting Artist Award, Scotland.
2002–2003	Junior Fellowship – Indian Department of Tourism & Culture.
2000-2001	Lalit Kala Akademi - Scholarship for Young Artist, India.
2000		Ovia Nunkalai Kuzhu, one man show Grant, Tamil Nadu, India.
1998		Tamil Nadu Ovia Nunkalai Kuzhu award, Chennai.India
1995		All India Crafts & Folk Festival South Zone Cultural center, at Government Museum Campus, Chennai.
1992		Certificate of merit from Government Museum, Madurai.

Camps and workshops participated 

2008		'mansoon artists’ camp organized by apparao gallery, chochin. 
2007		All India artists’ camp organized by Lalit Kala Akademi, Lonavla. 
2006		Edinburgh mela- intercontinental art camp, Edinburgh printmakers. Scotland 
2003		Interactive camp with Traditional papier-Mâché Artist and contemporary Artist organized by Silparamam- and Lalit Kala Akademi, Hyderabad.
2003		Traditional Kerala Mural painting workshop organised by N.F.S.C & G.C.A.C. Chennai.
2002		Traditional & Folk painters camp, for children book Illustration organized by N.B.T& Dastkari Haat Samiti.
2000		Workshop in Print making conducted by Mr. Paul Coldwell at L.K.A. Chennai.
1997		Young artist advanced lithography camp at Lalit Kala Akademi, Chennai.
1995		All India Crafts & Folk Festival  South Zone Cultural Centre, Thanjavur at Government Museum Campus, Chennai.
1991		Workshop conducted by Tamil Nadu Ovia Nunkalai Kuzhu- Kodaikanal.
1989–1991	Workshop at Government museum, Madurai.

Sources 

 http://www.thehindu.com/arts/art/article1146585.ece?sms_ss=facebook&at_xt=4d48bd77f8e68b0b%2C0
 https://web.archive.org/web/20110105114112/http://epaper.financialexpress.com/FE/FE/2011/01/02/index.shtml
 
 
http://www.apparaogalleries.com/index.php apparao art gallery
http://www.bindu-art.at/system/norm_layout.php?domain=1&new_lang=8 http://www.bindu-art.at/system/norm_layout.php?domain=1&new_lang=8
http://www.eca.ac.uk/index.php?id=1132
http://www.thehindu.com/arts/art/article56304.ece
http://artconcerns.net/2007feb1/html/delhi_sketchbook.htm

1975 births
Indian contemporary painters
Living people
Indian multimedia artists
New media artists
Artists from Chennai
Government College of Fine Arts, Chennai alumni
People from Madurai district
Painters from Tamil Nadu